Lewis Thomas (November 25, 1913 – December 3, 1993) was an American physician, poet, etymologist, essayist, administrator, educator, policy advisor, and researcher.

Life and career
Thomas was born in Flushing, New York and attended Princeton University and Harvard Medical School. He became Dean of Yale Medical School and New York University School of Medicine, and President of Memorial Sloan-Kettering Institute.  His formative years as an independent medical researcher were at Tulane University School of Medicine.

He was invited to write regular essays in the New England Journal of Medicine. One collection of those essays, The Lives of a Cell: Notes of a Biology Watcher (1974), won annual National Book Awards in two categories, Arts and Letters and The Sciences (both awards were split).
(He also won a Christopher Award for that book.) Two other collections of essays (originally published in NEJM and elsewhere) were The Medusa and the Snail and Late Night Thoughts on Listening to Mahler's Ninth Symphony. In its first paperback edition, The Medusa and the Snail won another National Book Award in Science.

His autobiography, The Youngest Science: Notes of a Medicine Watcher, is a record of a century of medicine and the changes which occurred in it. He also published a book on etymology titled Et Cetera, Et Cetera, poems, and numerous scientific papers.

Many of his essays discuss relationships among ideas or concepts using etymology as a starting point.  Others concern the cultural implications of scientific discoveries and the growing awareness of ecology. In his essay on Mahler's Ninth Symphony, Thomas addresses the anxieties produced by the development of nuclear weapons.  Thomas is often quoted, given his notably eclectic interests and superlative prose style.

Thomas was a member of the American Academy of Arts and Sciences (1961), the United States National Academy of Sciences (1972), and the American Philosophical Society (1976). The Lewis Thomas Prize is awarded annually by The Rockefeller University to a scientist for artistic achievement.

Books

The Lives of a Cell: Notes of a Biology Watcher, 1974, Viking Press: , Penguin Books, 1995 reprint: 
The Medusa and the Snail: More Notes of a Biology Watcher, 1979, Viking Press: , Penguin Books, 1995 reprint: 
Late Night Thoughts on Listening to Mahler's Ninth Symphony, 1983, Viking Press: , Penguin Books, 1995 reprint: 
The Youngest Science: Notes of a Medicine-Watcher, 1983, Viking: , Penguin Books, 1995 reprint: 
Et Cetera, Et Cetera: Notes of a Word-Watcher, 1990. Little Brown & Co , Welcome Rain, 2000 
The Fragile Species, 1992, Scribner, Simon & Schuster, 1996 paperback:

Notes

References

External links 
 Succinct review of Thomas' life and of the books listed above.
Gerald Weissmann, "Lewis Thomas", Biographical Memoirs of the National Academy of Sciences (2004)
 
 

1913 births
1993 deaths
Etymologists
American people of Welsh descent
American science writers
American medical writers
National Book Award winners
Physicians from New York City
Princeton University alumni
Harvard Medical School alumni
Yale University faculty
New York University faculty
20th-century American poets
20th-century American essayists
Members of the National Academy of Medicine
Members of the American Philosophical Society
Members of the American Academy of Arts and Letters